The pound or lira ( līra Libnāniyya; French: livre libanaise; abbreviation: LL in Latin,  in Arabic, historically also £L, ISO code: LBP) is the currency of Lebanon. It was formerly divided into 100 piastres (or qirsh in Arabic) but because of high inflation during the Lebanese Civil War (1975–1990) the use of subunits was discontinued.

The plural form of lira, as used in relation to the currency, is either lirat (ليرات līrāt) or invariant, whilst there were four forms for qirsh: the dual qirshān (قرشان) used with number 2, the plural qurush (قروش) used with numbers 3–10, the accusative singular qirshan (قرشا) used with 11–99, and the genitive singular qirsh (قرش) used with multiples of 100. The number determines which plural form is used. Before World War II, the Arabic spelling of the subdivision was قرش (qirsh). All of Lebanon's coins and banknotes are bilingual in Arabic and French.

From December 1997 through January 2023, the exchange rate was fixed at LL 1,507.50 per US dollar. However, since the 2020 economic crisis in Lebanon, exchange at this rate was generally unavailable, and an informal currency market developed with much higher exchange rates. On 1 February 2023, the Central Bank reset the currency peg at LL15,000 per US dollar.

History

Until World War I, the Turkish pound was the currency used in the area. In 1918, after the fall of the Ottoman Empire, the Egyptian pound was used. Upon gaining control of Syria and Lebanon, the French replaced the Egyptian pound with a new currency for Syria and Lebanon, the Syrian pound, which was linked to the franc at a value of LS 1 = 20 F. Lebanon issued its own coins from 1924 and banknotes from 1950. In 1939, the Lebanese currency was officially separated from that of Syria, though it was still linked to the French franc and remained interchangeable with Syrian money. In 1941, following France's defeat by Nazi Germany, the currency was linked instead to sterling at a rate of LL 8.83 = GBP1.00 A link to the French franc was restored after the war, but was abandoned in 1949.

Before the third phase of the Lebanese Civil War, USD1 was worth:
LL 3.07 in 1965
LL 3.26 in 1970
LL 2.25 in 1975
about LL 4 in 1981
In 1986 the pound began to fall against the dollar. On 13 June a dollar was worth LL 36.50. two weeks later it was worth LL 47.
LL 500 in 1987
LL 900 in December 1989
During the Civil War, the value decreased rapidly until 1992, when one US dollar was worth over LL 2,500. Subsequently, the value increased again, and since December 1997 the official rate has been fixed at LL 1,507.50 = USD1.00

In August 2019, pressure on the fixed exchange rate with the US dollar started, creating a parallel market rate. In March 2021, the black market rate in Beirut was LL 10,000 = USD1.00 By July 2021, it was around LL 24,000 to the dollar. On 18 March 2023, the value of the Lebanese pound dropped in the black market to LL 111,000 against the US dollar, its lowest value ever.

On 10 May 2021 the Lebanese Central Bank (BDL) announced the launch of the “Sayrafa” platform, an electronic platform intended to record all Lebanese Pounds foreign exchange transactions and identify the exchange rates at any point in time. The platform was launched in June 2021, and as of August 2022, the sayrafa exchange rate is around 20% less than the unofficial black market rate. From 1 February 2022 the Sayrafa rate became the official US dollar to lira exchange rate for all credit card transactions.

Coins
Lebanon's first coins were issued in 1924 in denominations of 2 and 5 piastres (p). Later issues did not include the word "syriennes" and were in denominations of p, 1p, 2p, p, 5p, 10p, 25p and 50p. During World War II, rather crudely made p, 1p and p coins were issued. Before the war all coins were minted in Paris.

After the war, the Arabic spelling was changed from girsh (غرش) to qirsh (قرش). Coins were issued in the period 1952 to 1986 in denominations of 1p, p, 5p, 10p, 25p, 50p and LL 1. No coins were issued between 1986 and 1994, when the current series of coins was introduced.

Coins in current use are:

Banknotes

Lebanon's first banknotes were issued by the Banque de Syrie et du Grand-Liban (Bank of Syria and Greater Lebanon) in 1925. Denominations ran from 25 piastres through to LL 100. In 1939, the bank's name was changed to the Bank of Syria and Lebanon. The first LL 250 notes appeared that year. Between 1942 and 1950, the government issued "small change" notes in denominations of 5p, 10p, 25p and 50p. After 1945, the Bank of Syria and Lebanon continued to issue paper money for Lebanon but the notes were denominated specifically in "Lebanese pounds" (ليرة لبنانية, livre libanaise) to distinguish them from Syrian notes. Notes for LL 1, LL 5, LL 10, LL 25, LL 50 and LL 100 were issued.

The Banque du Liban (Bank of Lebanon) was established by the Code of Money and Credit on 1 April 1964. On 1 August 1963 decree No. 13.513 of the "Law of References: Banque Du Liban 23 Money and Credit" granted the Bank of Lebanon the sole right to issue notes in denominations of LL 1, LL 5, LL 10, LL 25, LL 50, LL 100, and LL 250, expressed in Arabic on the front, and French on the back. Higher denominations were issued in the 1980s and 1990s as inflation drastically reduced the currency's value.

Banknotes in current use are:

All current notes feature an Arabic side with the value in Arabic script numerals of large size. The other side is in French with the serial number in both Arabic and Latin script and in bar code below the latter one.

Devaluation
 
Since September 2019, the exchange rate had forked into multiple distinct rates due to Lebanon's banking sector collapse. Within six months, five distinct Lebanese pound rates were defined against the US dollar, officially and unofficially. They were valued at:
 Official rate = 15,000 (February 2023). From December 1997 through January 2023, the exchange rate was fixed at LL 1,507.50 per US dollar. That official rate had been pegged for over 25 years, but since Lebanon's financial crisis of 2019 it became effectively obsolete.  The official rate was increased by a multiple of 9.95 on 1 February 2023 as per decision of the central bank to reach LL 15,000 per USD.
Lebanon's Central Bank's "Sayrafa" rate = LL 75,800 (March 2023). The Sayrafa rate is the rate the central bank redeems international credit and debit card payments.
"Lollar" (bank withdrawals of US$ in LL) = LL 8,000.
Parallel market rate = LL 100,000 (March 2023).
 

The parallel (or black) market rate is significantly higher than the official exchange rate.

Lollar

The "lollar" is a deposit denominated in US dollars in the Lebanese banking system. It is a nominal balance stuck or frozen in the Lebanese banks, with currency value simply as a computer entry. The lollar is not a tangible currency, but is a concept of an outstanding deposit in US dollars in Lebanese banks that can only be withdrawn in Lebanese pounds at a very reduced set rate and considerably lower than the highly speculative black market rate which is multiple times higher. There are also limits put on the total amount that can be withdrawn on the lollars. The term was coined by Harvard University economic fellow Dan Azzi after the Lebanese banks suffered serious difficulties and restricted the amount of US dollars and other foreign currencies they could pay to their depositors.

See also
 Economy of Lebanon

References

External links
 Banque du Liban
 Historical and current banknotes of Lebanon
 sayrafa price from banque du liban

Currencies of Lebanon
Fixed exchange rate
Currencies introduced in 1924